Greystone, also known as the James E. Stagg House, is a historic home located at Durham, Durham County, North Carolina.  It was designed by architect Charles Christian Hook and built in 1911.  It is a -story, six bay, Châteauesque style granite, limestone, and brick dwelling. It features a deep porch with porte cochere, projecting bays with conical roofs, tall chimney stacks, and a high hipped roof with numerous dormers and heavy yellow-green clay tiles. The house was divided into six apartments about 1961.

It was listed on the National Register of Historic Places in 1982.

References

Houses on the National Register of Historic Places in North Carolina
Châteauesque architecture in the United States
Houses completed in 1911
Houses in Durham, North Carolina
National Register of Historic Places in Durham County, North Carolina